The Sedat Simavi Literature Prize is a Turkish literary award presented annually. It was established in 1977 by Sedat Simavi Foundation, in memory of author and journalist, Sedat Simavi.  The prize is given also in nine different areas in sport, TV, radio, reporting, healthy, science, social sciences and visual arts.

Award winners
2021 Orhan Pamuk
2020 Beşir Ayvazoğlu
2019 Hidayet Sayın
2018 Kamuran Şipal
2017 Cevat Çapan
2016 Haluk Oral
2015 Nilüfer Kuyaş
2014 Murat Gülsoy
2013 Hasan Ali Toptaş
2012 Ahmet Cemal
2011 Burhan Sönmez
2010 Adnan Binyazar
2009 Cemil Kavukçu
2008 Arif Damar
2007 Ahmet Oktay
2006 Tarık Dursun K.
2005 Latife Tekin
2004 Demir Özlü
2003 Selim İleri
2002 Tomris Uyar
2001 Erdal Öz
2000 Jale Parla
1999 Tahsin Yücel
1998 
1997 Fakir Baykurt, Feyza Hepçilingirler
1996 Orhan Duru
1995 Nermi Uygur, Minâ Urgan
1994 Bilge Karasu
1993 Oktay Akbal, Vüs'at O. Bener
1992 Mehmet Fuat, Gülten Akın
1991 Cevdet Kudret, Fethi Naci
1990 Sabahattin Kudret Aksal
1989 Vedat Günyol
1988 İlhan Berk, Ferit Edgü
1987 Hilmi Yavuz
1986 Salâh Birsel
1985 Yaşar Kemal
1984 Turgut Uyar
1983 Pertev Naili Boratav, Haldun Taner
1982 No awarded
1981 Edip Cansever
1980 Oktay Rifat
1979 Adalet Ağaoğlu
1978 Melih Cevdet Anday
1977 Peride Celal, Fazıl Hüsnü Dağlarca

See also
 List of literary awards
 List of years in literature
 Literary award
 Turkish literature

References

External links

Turkish literary awards
Awards established in 1977
Turkish awards